Md. Zillul Hakim is a Bangladesh Awami League politician and the incumbent Member of Parliament from Rajbari-2.

Early life
Hakim was born on 2 January 1954. He has a Masters in Art.

Career
Hakim was elected to Parliament from Rajbari-2 in 2008 and 2014 as a Bangladesh Awami League candidate. On 6 March 2018, he inaugurated a Bangladesh Awami League office built on 8 decimal of Zila Parishad and Water Development Board land in Baliakandi Upazila, Rajbari District.

References

Awami League politicians
Living people
10th Jatiya Sangsad members
11th Jatiya Sangsad members
1954 births